Do Over is an American fantasy sitcom television series created by Kenny Schwartz and Rick Wiener about a man who gets a chance to relive his childhood. The series, which was originally broadcast on The WB from September 19 to December 5, 2002, and it stars Penn Badgley.

Synopsis
The series begins showing an adult Joel Larsen as a single, depressed paper salesman disappointed with how his life turned out. Joel missed a lot of opportunities; his once-popular sister is now a drug-addict, his idealistic best friend sold out, and his mother ran off and left his father an unhealthy, bitter man. However, a shock from defibrillation paddles sends Joel back to 1981 as his 14-year-old self. He wakes up in his teenage body, but with all his adult memories from 2002 intact. He eventually accepts this new reality, although he tells no one except his best friend, Pat. Blessed with adult wisdom, though hampered by adolescent urges, Joel sets out to right the wrongs that he knows will befall him and his family.

Joel is forced to readjust to the culture of the early 1980s, to junior high, and the trials and tribulations of adolescence. He is forced to relive certain moments of his life, but is always determined to improve the outcome. A running gag in the show is Joel's creative mother coming up with a "new" invention (fanny pack, Lunchables, post-its, etc.) which is usually ridiculed by the father, who instead wants to invest in items such as asbestos tile, Betamax cassettes, or electric typewriters. Some episodes show Joel using his knowledge of the future for personal gain: investing in Intel stock, palming off 1990s song hits as his own, befriending a future billionaire, etc. However, the situations never work out according to plan and Joel usually ends up realizing he needs to use this opportunity to help himself, his family and friends take different paths. The final episode of the series shows Joel convincing his father to invest in one of his mother's inventions, which to Joel's surprise is the one invention that doesn't exist in the future. It ends with Joel and his family toasting the future.

Cast
 Penn Badgley as Joel Larsen
 Tom Everett Scott as the voice of adult Joel Larsen
 Angela Goethals as Cheryl Larsen, Joel's sister
 Josh Wise as Pat Brody, Joel's best friend
 Natasha Melnick as Isabelle Meyers, Joel's other close friend
 Michael Milhoan as Bill Larsen, Joel's dad
 Gigi Rice as Karen Larsen, Joel's mom

Theme song
The theme song was Do It Over by the Go-Go's. It was usually prefaced by an introductory statement by adult Joel Larson.

Episodes

Reception and cancellation 
The show originally aired on The WB in 2002. It was scheduled on Thursdays at 8:30 EST. The show was pitted against CBS's Survivor and NBC's Scrubs. Although the show had a devoted fan base, it suffered from low ratings and was cancelled after showing eleven of fifteen episodes. The entire series, including the final four episodes, aired on Channel 4 in Great Britain in September 2008.

Awards and nominations

References

External links
 
 

2000s American single-camera sitcoms
2000s American teen sitcoms
2002 American television series debuts
2002 American television series endings
English-language television shows
American fantasy television series
American time travel television series
Television series about teenagers
Television series by CBS Studios
Television shows set in Massachusetts
The WB original programming
Television series set in 1981
2000s American time travel television series